Antti Kempas (born 3 October 1980 in Helsinki) is a Finnish race walker.

He finished eleventh at the 2007 World Championships in Osaka. He also competed at the 2006 European Championships (where he did not finish) and the 2005 World Championships.

Kempas competed in the 2008 Summer Olympics, where he placed 20th in a time of 3:55:19 hours, and the 2012 Summer Olympics and placed 41st in 4:01:50 hours.

References

1980 births
Living people
Athletes from Helsinki
Finnish male racewalkers
Athletes (track and field) at the 2008 Summer Olympics
Athletes (track and field) at the 2012 Summer Olympics
Olympic athletes of Finland